Helga Gunerius Eriksen (born 11 October 1950) is a Norwegian novelist and children's writer.

She made her literary debut in 1986 with the children's book På stripejakt. Among her other children's books are Båten i treet  from 1988, Vi kjem frå havet from 1998, and Flugepapir from 2003, which earned her the Brage Prize. Among her novels is Rut from 2002.

She was awarded the Critics Prize for the year's best children's or youth's literature for Finn Inga! in 1991.

References

1950 births
Living people
People from Stavanger
20th-century Norwegian novelists
21st-century Norwegian novelists
Norwegian children's writers
Norwegian women novelists
Norwegian women children's writers
21st-century Norwegian women writers
20th-century Norwegian women writers